Lance A. Schulters (born May 27, 1975) is an American football coach and a former American football safety. He was drafted by the San Francisco 49ers in the fourth round of the 1998 NFL Draft. He played college football at Hofstra.

A Pro Bowl selection with the 49ers in 1999, Schulters also played for the Tennessee Titans, Miami Dolphins, Atlanta Falcons and New Orleans Saints.

College career
Schulters attended Canarsie High School, where he played football under coach Mike Camardese. Schulters moved on to Nassau Community College in Garden City, New York, becoming a two-year starter before transferring to Hofstra in 1996. He played two seasons for the Flying Dutchmen, becoming a two-time All-America selection and the 1997 I-AA Independent Defensive Player of the Year. He was inducted into the Hofstra Athletics Hall of Fame in 2013.

Professional career

San Francisco 49ers
Schulters played the first four seasons of his career with the San Francisco 49ers.  After winning the starting free safety job in the first week of the 1999–2000 season from aging Pro Bowl safety Merton Hanks, Schulters played a major role in the 49ers' first win of the season, in Week 2 against the New Orleans Saints at home, intercepting a pass from Billy Joe Hobert and returning it 64 yards for a dramatic touchdown that broke a 21–21 tie with 1:31 left in the game.  Schulters finished the season with six interceptions returned for 121 yards while starting in 13 games for the 49ers, earning himself a trip to the Pro Bowl.  Schulters played in San Francisco for two more seasons, and was part of a playoff team with a regular-season record of 12–4 in his last year before signing with the Tennessee Titans after the 2001–02 season.

Tennessee Titans
Schulters played three seasons with the Tennessee Titans. He was cut by the Titans prior to the 2005 season.

First stint with Dolphins
In 2005, Schulters signed with the Miami Dolphins, recording four interceptions and 77 tackles on the season.

Atlanta Falcons
He signed with the Atlanta Falcons on November 8, 2006, as a backup to replace injured defensive back Kevin Mathis.

Second stint with Dolphins
On October 24, 2007, the Dolphins resigned Schulters after suffering several injuries in their secondary.

New Orleans Saints
On August 18, 2008, Schulters signed with the New Orleans Saints. He was released by the team on August 29.

NFL statistics

Coaching career
Schulters became the defensive backs coach at Bryant University in 2011. He joined the Bill Walsh Diversity Coaching Fellowship and landed a job with the Seattle Seahawks.

Atlanta Falcons
Schulters joined the Atlanta Falcons as a special teams intern in 2015 and eventually became a defensive assistant.

Los Angeles Rams
Schulters followed Raheem Morris, the Falcons' former interim head coach and Schulters' former teammate at Hofstra, to the Los Angeles Rams as a coaching fellow in 2021. The Rams won the Super Bowl in his first season on their staff. He was promoted to a role as a defensive assistant in 2022. He was fired on January 18, 2023.

Schulters' son, K-Shawn, is a defensive back at Villanova.

References

1975 births
Living people
American football safeties
Hofstra Pride football players
San Francisco 49ers players
Tennessee Titans players
Miami Dolphins players
Atlanta Falcons players
New Orleans Saints players
National Conference Pro Bowl players
People from Canarsie, Brooklyn
Players of American football from New York (state)
Guyanese emigrants to the United States
Guyanese players of American football
Afro-Guyanese people
Canarsie High School alumni
Los Angeles Rams coaches
Ed Block Courage Award recipients